The  is a constituency that represents Niigata Prefecture in the House of Councillors in the Diet of Japan. Since July 2019, it has two Councillors in the 242-member house, a decrease from its previous contingent of 3.

Outline
The constituency represents the entire population of Niigata Prefecture and has 1,925,565 registered voters as of September 2015. Since the first House of Councillors election in 1947 Niigata has elected four Councillors to six-year terms, two at alternating elections held every three years. The district's number of voters is the third-lowest of the 10 prefectures that are represented by four Councillors; by comparison, the Hokkaido, Hyogo at-large district and Fukuoka districts each have more than 4 million voters but are represented by the same number of Councillors as Niigata. To address this malapportionment in representation, a 2015 revision of the Public Officers Election Law decrease the representation of Niigata, Miyagi and Nagano districts to two Councillors while increasing Hyogo, Hokkaido and Fukuoka districts to six Councillors. This change took effect at the 2016 election, after which time, Niigata will elect only one Councillor during every election.

The Councillors currently representing Niigata are:
 Yuko Mori (LP, third term; term ends in 2022)
 Sakura Uchikoshi (CDP, first term; term ends in 2025)

Elected Councillors

Election results

See also
List of districts of the House of Councillors of Japan

References 

Districts of the House of Councillors (Japan)